The ITTF World Tour, known as the ITTF Pro Tour until 2011, is an annual series of table tennis tournaments introduced by International Table Tennis Federation (ITTF) in 1996. The tour includes events in seven categories: Men's and Women's Singles, Men's, Women's, and Mixed Doubles, and Under-21 Men's and Women's Singles. The tour has its own points system, with players accumulating points based on their performances in the tournaments they enter.

Since 2017, the ITTF also announced that the World Tour would be split into two tiers, with six World Tour Platinum, the new top tier of World Tour, and six regular World Tour events. The players who gain the most points in each of the seven different categories will be invited to participate in the ITTF World Tour Grand Finals at the end of the year.

Overview

ITTF Pro Tour (1996–2011)
Number of tournaments in each year (Grand Finals not counted):

ITTF World Tour (2012–present)
Number of tournaments in each year (Grand Finals not counted):

Winners of the tournaments

Grand Finals

Tournaments by year
This is a list of tournaments that have featured in the ITTF Pro Tour and ITTF World Tour since 1996, with "•" indicating the years in which each tournament featured.

From 2004 to 2009, and again from 2011 to 2013, there were two China Open tournaments in each calendar year.

Since 2017, the ITTF Challenge Series has been run as a separate tour, reducing the number of tournaments on the main ITTF World Tour.

Business
On 12 January 2017, it was announced that Chinese shipping company Seamaster had agreed a four-year sponsorship and strategic partnership deal with the ITTF World Tour.

See also
 World Table Tennis Championships
 Table Tennis World Cup
 Table tennis at the Summer Olympics

References

External links
 ITTF World Tour
 ITTF Statistics

 
International Table Tennis Federation
Table tennis tours and series
Recurring sporting events established in 1996